Minchina Ota may refer to:

Minchina Ota (1980 film)
Minchina Ota (2008 film)